Vice-Admiral Mamy Ranaivoniarivo (born 6 December 1950, in Ambalavao, Haute Matsiatra) was briefly the defence minister of Madagascar in early 2009. He was appointed to office on February 9, 2009, following Cécile Manorohanta's resignation, but resigned on March 10, 2009, after he was confronted by mutineer army officers who stated that they would no longer follow orders from current Malagasy president Marc Ravalomanana and instead switch allegiances to Andry Rajoelina, but this was later rescinded as Ranaivoniarivo explained that the "resignation" had been done under gunpoint.

References

1950 births
Living people
People from Haute Matsiatra
Malagasy politicians
Malagasy military personnel